Om kjærligheten synger de (They Sing about Love) is a Norwegian film from 1946. It was directed by Olav Dalgard and starred Harald Heide Steen in the lead role. The film deals with poverty in Oslo in the 1930s. The film premiered at the Klingenberg Cinema on October 30, 1946.

Cast

 Harald Heide Steen as Gustav Granbakken
 Elisabeth Gording as Maja Granbakken
 Stig Egede-Nissen as Måka
 Berit Brænne as Bella
 Alfred Solaas as Potten
 Finn Bernhoft as Larsen, a hotel owner
 Randi Baumann
 Edvard Drabløs as Stoffer
 Frithjof Fearnley as the judge
 Nils Hald as Drøbak
 Alfred Helgeby
 Bjarne Lindskog
 Dagmar Myhrvold as Mrs. Larsen
 Einar Rudaa as the mortgagor
 Ragnar Schreiner as Røden
 Aud Schønemann
 Erna Schøyen as Mathilde Evensrud
 Hans Stormoen as Gamlebåsen
 Knut Thomassen as the defense lawyer
 Lars Tvinde as Langeland, a pastor
 Einar Vaage as Beine
 Kåre Wicklund

References

External links

Om kjærligheten synger de at the National Library of Norway

1946 films
Norwegian films based on plays
1940s Norwegian-language films
Norwegian drama films
Films directed by Olav Dalgard